Aadmi Sadak Ka is a 1977 Bollywood drama film produced and directed by Devendra Goel, it stars Shatrughan Sinha, Zaheera, Sujit Kumar, Deven Verma, Asit Sen and Agha. The film's music is by Ravi.

Plot
The Nath family consists of Retired Commissioner Upendra, his wife, Savitri; elder son, Madan, who is married to Maya, and they have a son, Ashoo; a second son - Surendra, who is married to Kamla, and they have a daughter, Pinky; a third unmarried college-going son, Chander; and a school-going daughter, Namrata. They are a happy family, and everyone rejoices when Chander completes his M.A. There is more reason to rejoice when Chander introduces them to the woman he loves, Vandana, the only daughter of wealthy Mr. Tandon. The marriage is arranged with a ceremony, attended by the family friend, Abdul, who home-delivers groceries.

However, before the marriage could be sealed, Upendra receives news that he has lost his court case, and dies. The wedding is canceled, and the lives of the entire Nath family change thereafter, with Kamla and Maya taking over the household, reducing Savitri to the status of an unwanted guest, while Namrata is asked to become the servant and is unable to complete her education, and Chander, who rebels, is asked to leave. Vandana's father learns of their plight and refuses to permit his daughter to marry into the Nath family. Chander moves in with Abdul, gets a job as a waiter, then he is promoted to manager, and finally as partner and co-owner of the Francis Hotel. Unable to get medication, Savitri died, forcing Namrata to move in with Abdul as well. Madan and Surendra also find success when they buy their own hotel and name it "Gulmohar Hotel". With Chander on one hand, and his two siblings on the other - they are now poised to compete with each other - not knowing who will win in this cut-throat competition - as they set out to destroy each other.

Cast
Shatrughan Sinha as Abdul
Vikram as Chandramohan "Chander"
Zaheera as Vandana Tandon
Sujit Kumar as Madanmohan "Madan" 
Deven Verma as Surendramohan "Suren" 
Asit Sen as Kundanlal
David as Rustam
Agha as Bus Driver (Gulmohar Hotel) 
Mumtaz Begum as Abdul's mother
Gajanan Jagirdar as Retired Police Commissioner Upendranath
Pinchoo Kapoor as Mr. Tandon

Soundtrack
The music was composed by Ravi and the lyrics were written by Verma Malik. The soundtrack, "Aaj Mere Yaar Ki Shaadi Hai", became an instant anthem played and sung across the world in South Asian weddings by live musicians and included as an audio piece in wedding videos.

External links

References

1977 films
1970s Hindi-language films
Films scored by Ravi
Films directed by Devendra Goel
Indian drama films